In the Mist and Other Uncanny Encounters is a collection of stories by British writer Elizabeth Walter.  It was released in 1979 and was the author's first book published by Arkham House .  It was published in an edition of 4,053 copies.  The stories were selected by the author and were those she considered to be her best.

Contents

In the Mist and Other Uncanny Encounters contains the following tales:

 "Preface"
 "The Concrete Captain"
 "The Sin Eater"
 "In the Mist"
 "Come and Get Me"
 "The Island of Regrets"
 "The Hare"
 "Davy Jones's Tale"

Sources

1979 short story collections
Fantasy short story collections
Horror short story collections
Arkham House books